This page shows the results of the Taekwondo Competition at the 1995 Pan American Games, held from July 23 to August 8, 1995, in Mar del Plata, Argentina. There were a total number of eight medal events, four for both men and women.

Men's competition

Finweight (– 50 kg)

Flyweight (– 54 kg)

Bantamweight (– 58 kg)

Featherweight (– 64 kg)

Lightweight (– 70 kg)

Welterweight (– 76 kg)

Middleweight (– 83 kg)

Heavyweight (+ 83 kg)

Women's competition

Finweight (– 43 kg)

Flyweight (– 47 kg)

Bantamweight (– 51 kg)

Featherweight (– 55 kg)

Lightweight (– 60 kg)

Welterweight (– 65 kg)

Middleweight (– 70 kg)

Heavyweight (+ 70 kg)

Medal table

References
 Sports 123

P
1995